The Maltese Third Division 2008–09 (known as the BOV 3rd Division 2008–09 due to sponsorship reasons) is the 9th season of the Maltese Third Division. It started in September 2008 and ended in late May 2009, with the promotion play-off finals. This division is divided into two sections: Section A, with ten teams and Section B, with nine. The winners from both sections will face each other in a play-off where the winner is crowned as champion of this division, but both teams will still be given promotion to the Second Division.

Gharghur were the winners of Section A, while Gzira United were the winners of Section B. Gzira United finished the season as overall champions after they beat Gharghur 3–0.

Zurrieq were also promoted after winning the promotion play-offs, beating Santa Lucia on penalties in the final. Santa Lucia beat Naxxar Lions in the semi-final.

Clubs

Section A

 Fgura
 Gharghur
 Ghaxaq
 Gudja
 Kalkara
 Luqa
 Mdina
 Qrendi
 Sirens
 Xghajra

Section B

 Attard
 Gzira
 Kirkop
 Mtarfa
 Pembroke
 Siggiewi
 Santa Lucia
 Zejtun
 Zurrieq

Changes from previous season

Relegated from 2007–08 Maltese Second Division
 Sirens F.C.
 Zurrieq F.C.

League table

Section A

Section B

Champions playoff

|}

Promotion-relegation play-off
Participating

Quarter final 

|}

Gudja United remain in Maltese Third Division

Semi finals

|}

Mdina Knights remain in Maltese Third Division
Naxxar Lions relegated to Maltese Third Division

Final

|}

Zurrieq promoted to Maltese Second Division
Santa Lucia remain in Maltese Third Division

Results

Section A

Section B

External links
Third Division on MaltaFootball.com

Maltese Third Division seasons
4
Malta